Pietro Venturi was an Italian lawyer and politician. He was twice acting mayor of Rome, first from May to November 1872, and then from August 1874 to January 1875. He was mayor of Rome, Kingdom of Italy from January 1875 to November 1877.

References

19th-century Italian lawyers
19th-century Italian politicians
Mayors of Rome
Year of birth missing
Year of death missing